Hoseynabad (also Romanized as Ḩoseynābād; also known as Husainābad) is a village in Hendijan-e Gharbi Rural District, in the Central District of Hendijan County, Khuzestan Province, Iran. At the 2006 census, its population was 393, in 79 families.

References 

Populated places in Hendijan County